Presto was an Australian media streaming company which offered subscriptions to unlimited viewing of selected films, and from 2015, TV series. The service, initially owned wholly by Foxtel, launched on 13 March 2014 featuring films exclusively.

There were three separate subscription options for Presto, named Presto Movies, Presto TV, and the bundled option Presto Entertainment. It competed primarily against Australian streaming company Quickflix, the American-based Netflix and the Fairfax Media and Nine Entertainment Co. joint venture Stan.

In October 2016, it was announced that Presto would cease operations on 31 January 2017.

History

Presto Movies 
The service initially launched contract-free on 13 March 2014 at AU$19.99, but was lowered to AU$9.99 in August 2014. Films tend to be mostly recent releases, and come from Foxtel's suite of Foxtel Movies channels, who have relationships with studios including MGM, NBCUniversal, Paramount Pictures, Roadshow Films, Sony Pictures Entertainment, Twentieth Century Fox, The Walt Disney Company, Warner Bros Entertainment, Entertainment One (which formerly owned Hopscotch, but Hopscotch ceased operations by 2015, yet it still owns the rights to its catalog), Icon, Studiocanal and Transmission Films.

Presto TV and Presto Entertainment 
On 8 December 2014, Foxtel and Seven West Media announced a spin-off of Presto Movies to launch before March 2015, to be named Presto Entertainment, which will feature television programs, with content coming from both Foxtel channels and the Seven Network. The existing Presto Movies service will continue to be available, but each will require a separate subscription. It became available on 15 January 2015, and was named Presto TV, with Presto Entertainment referring to the bundled offer for both movies and TV access at $14.99

Australian content made available from Foxtel will include Wentworth, Satisfaction, Love My Way, Spirited, and Tangle. Local Seven Network content includes Packed to the Rafters, All Saints, City Homicide, Home and Away, Winners & Losers and Always Greener. Foreign content will include Mr Selfridge, Lewis, A Touch of Frost and Rosemary and Thyme. Aquarius will join Presto after it premieres on the Seven Network.

Presto also had exclusive access to HBO programming including Entourage, The Sopranos and Boardwalk Empire, with the notable exception of Game of Thrones. A non-exclusive deal was also reached with Showtime, which includes programs such as Ray Donovan, Dexter, Californication, however these programs were also featured on rival service Stan.

Presto also commissioned its own local content in the form of short-form streaming series Let's Talk About, written, directed and starring Matilda Brown and Richard Davies. 

From May 2015, Presto started offering Australian premiere content, including Mr. Robot, Bitten, The Firm, Matador and Rogue.

Closure 

In October 2016, it was announced by the company that Seven West Media's 50% stake in Presto will be bought out by Foxtel and Presto will cease operations on 31 January 2017. Existing Presto subscribers were also given automatic access to Foxtel's own streaming service, Foxtel Now.

Marketing and subscription numbers

Presto Entertainment cost $14.99 per month, which analysts noted was more expensive than rivals Netflix and Stan, which don't differentiate between film and television programming on their service.

Roughly 5 months after launch, it was suggested Presto Movies was struggling, with only "a few thousand subscribers". In May 2015, Roy Morgan Research found that Netflix had 1.039 million Australian users, compared to 97,000 for Presto and 91,000 for Stan. In October 2015, Nine Entertainment said that Stan had 150,000-200,000 paying subscribers, which they said was ahead of Presto's estimated 100,000 customers. It was later reported that Presto had approximately 130,000 paying subscribers as of September 2016, the month before the company announced it would cease operations the following January.

In May 2016, Presto had a public campaign in Melbourne involving a graffiti artist to promote the addition of Empire to the service.

See also

Internet television in Australia
Subscription television in Australia

References

External links 
Presto

Defunct video on demand services
Subscription video on demand services
Defunct subscription services
Australian streaming companies
Companies based in Sydney
Internet properties established in 2014
Mass media companies established in 2014
Internet properties disestablished in 2017
Mass media companies disestablished in 2017
Australian companies established in 2014
Australian companies disestablished in 2017